Lysapsus is a genus of frogs in the family Hylidae found in South America east of the Andes. Their common name is harlequin frogs.

Many frogs in Lysapsus have a paradoxical life cycle.  They are most massive when they are older tadpoles and slightly smaller when they are adult frogs.

Species
There are four species:
 Lysapsus bolivianus (Gallardo, 1961)
 Lysapsus caraya (Gallardo, 1964)
 Lysapsus laevis (Parker, 1935)
 Lysapsus limellum (Cope, 1862)
The status of Lysapsus bolivianus is unclear; it might be a subspecies of Lysapsus limellum.

References

 
Hylidae
Amphibians of South America
Amphibian genera
Taxa named by Edward Drinker Cope